Public Account was a weekly political programme first transmitted on 6 January 1975 by BBC Television in Scotland.  It was the sister programme to BBC Scotland's Current Account which covered general current affairs issues rather than politics.
 
Public Account was transmitted mainly on BBC1 Scotland on Mondays after 22.45.  It was designed to reflect the increased interest in politics in Scotland with the discovery of oil in the North Sea and the rise of the fortunes of the Scottish National Party.  It covered politics up to the first Devolution Referendum held by the Callaghan Labour government.  The last programme was shown on 3 July 1978.

Ground-breaking in its approach to Scottish and British politics, it was presented by Donald MacCormick later of BBC2 Newsnight, James Cox later of R4 The World This Weekend, and Andrew Neil later Editor of The Sunday Times and currently presenter of BBC2 The Daily Politics.

Tom Ross was the producer and Matthew Spicer was the editor.

Notes

References
   

Inside BBC Scotland by Alastair Hetherington p. 48 (Whitewater Press)

1975 British television series debuts
1975 establishments in Scotland
1975 in politics
1978 British television series endings
1978 disestablishments in Scotland
BBC Scotland
BBC Television shows
Politics of Scotland